The Murrindindi River, an inland perennial river of the Goulburn Broken catchment, part of the Murray-Darling basin, is located in the lower South Eastern Highlands bioregion and Northern Country/North Central regions of the Australian state of Victoria. The headwaters of the Murrindindi River rise on the western slopes of the Victorian Alps and descend to flow into the Yea River.

Location and features

The Murrindindi River rises from the Great Dividing Range near Mount Monda, and flows northwest through the Murrindindi River Scenic Reserve between the Toolangi and Black Range State Forests. The river descends  over its  course.

The name of the river is derived from the name of the pastoral run. Gold was discovered in the river in 1866.

See also

References

External links

Goulburn Broken catchment
Rivers of Hume (region)
Tributaries of the Goulburn River
Victorian Alps